Megaperidae is a family of flatworms belonging to the order Plagiorchiida.

Genera:
 Megapera Manter, 1934
 Paraschistorchis Blend, Karar & Dronen, 2017
 Plesioschistorchis Blend, Karar & Dronen, 2017

References

Platyhelminthes